The FIL European Luge Championships 1971 took place in Imst, Austria for the second time after having previously hosted the championships in 1956. A record four countries won medals at these championships.

Men's singles

Women's singles

Men's doubles

Medal table

References
Men's doubles European champions
Men's singles European champions
Women's singles European champions

FIL European Luge Championships
1971 in luge
Luge in Austria
1971 in Austrian sport